Sol Shor (July 17, 1913 – May 1985) was a film and television screenwriter credited mostly with B-westerns and movie serials.

Shor was born in the Bronx and graduated from the City College of New York. After working as general manager of the Novelty Manufacturing Company and as a freelancer, Shor was signed as a writer to Republic Pictures in 1937.

Sol Shor admitted to having been an American Communist Party member before the House Un-American Activities Committee and named other party members in his testimony.

Shor died in May 1985 in New Rochelle, New York.

Filmography
The Lone Ranger Rides Again (1939)
Dick Tracy's G-Men (1939)
Drums of Fu Manchu (1940)
Adventures of Captain Marvel (1941)
The Yukon Patrol (1942)
The Crimson Ghost (serial, 1946)
Daughter of the Jungle (1949)
Federal Agents vs. Underworld, Inc. (1949)
Ghost of Zorro (serial, 1949)
King of the Rocket Men (serial, 1949)
Flame of Calcutta (1953)
Savage Mutiny (1953)

External links
Sol Shor at Allmovie.com

References

1913 births
1985 deaths
American communists
American male screenwriters
City College of New York alumni
People from the Bronx
Writers from New Rochelle, New York
American television writers
American male television writers
Screenwriters from New York (state)
20th-century American male writers
20th-century American screenwriters